The Men's 15 kilometre freestyle at the FIS Nordic World Ski Championships 2013 was held on 27 February 2013. A 10 km qualifying event took place on 20 February.

Results

Race 
The race started at 12:45.

Qualification  
The  Qualification was held at 10:45.

References

FIS Nordic World Ski Championships 2013